Alhaji Abdulsalam Sanyaolu is a Nigerian actor from Abeokuta, Ogun State. He mainly acts in Yoruba-language films in "Nollywood".

Career

Alhaji Abdulsalam Sanyaolu began acting in 1953 at a church in Lagos.

References

External links
https://www.nigeriafilms.com/more/80-interviews/9635-my-only-regret-alhaji-abdulsalam-sanyaolu-a-k-a-charles-olumo-or-agbako
http://www.saharaweeklyng.com/im-not-pasumas-biological-father-charles-olumo-aka-agbako/

Living people
Nigerian male film actors
20th-century Nigerian male actors
Yoruba male actors
Male actors in Yoruba cinema
Male actors from Abeokuta
Year of birth missing (living people)
Nigerian male television actors
People from Abeokuta
20th-century births
Male actors from Ogun State
21st-century Nigerian male actors